Eupterote hibisci is a moth in the family Eupterotidae. It was described by Johan Christian Fabricius in 1775. It is found in India.

References

Moths described in 1775
Eupterotinae
Taxa named by Johan Christian Fabricius